Oleg Aleksandrovich Safonov (born August 24, 1960 in Ulyanovsk, Soviet Union) is a Russian official. In 1982 he graduated from the Border Guards Higher School of the KGB in Moscow and subsequently served for the KGB until 1991. It is sometimes claimed that for some time he served in Dresden together with Vladimir Putin. In 1991-1994 he worked under Vladimir Putin in the Committee for the External Relations of the Saint Petersburg Mayor's Office. From November 14, 1996, to October 30, 2007, Safonov was a deputy Interior Minister of Russia, appointed by President Putin. On October 30, 2007, Vladimir Putin appointed him plenipotentiary envoy to the Far Eastern Federal District. Safonov was believed to be married to a daughter of Viktor Ivanov.  However, in April 2009, an article indicated that Oleg Safonov's wife was named Lyudmila Gennadayevna.  An alternate theory is that the Safonovs' daughter, Elizabeta, is married to Viktor Ivanov's son, Yaroslav.

References

KGB officers
Living people
1960 births
United Russia politicians